Formosa Automobile Corporation is a Taiwanese automobile company, founded on October 20, 1996 by Mr. Lee Tzung-Chang of the Taiwanese Formosa Plastics Group. Formosa Automobile Corporation started after buying the factory from the unsuccessful Sanfu Motor Co., Ltd. The initial plan included producing LPG and petroleum vehicles and increasing production and management experience in vehicle production.

On November 11, 1999 Formosa Automobile Corporation started the product license corporation with GM Daewoo to produce the Magnus sedan under the Formosa branding as their first product. The Formosa Magnus was a re-branded Daewoo Magnus sedan running on the SC-1 DOHC 2.0L engine by GM The Formosa Matiz hatchback was added later, based on the new-badge Daewoo Matiz. The development of electric vehicles was also planned.

In 2004, Formosa Automobile Corporation shut down the self-owned Formosa brand due to long-term financial loss.

In 2005, Formosa Automobile Corporation acquired the procuration rights of the Czech Republic Skoda brand of VAG and introduced the Fabia, Octavia, Superb, and Roomster passenger cars. Due to the high prices of Skoda cars, Formosa Automobile Corporation abstained from the procuration rights of the Skoda brand in 2007 with the aftermarket maintenance transferred to the Formosa Automobile commercial subsidiary.

By the end of 2006, Formosa Automobile Corporation had only the production line of the DAF Trucks brand left with the Formosa Automobile commercial subsidiary in charge. Future plans include the export sales of South East Asian markets and DAF Trucks Taiwan is only in charge of sales and service.

See also
 Transportation in Taiwan
 List of Taiwanese automakers
 List of companies of Taiwan
 DAF

References

External links
DAF Taiwan

Taiwanese companies established in 1996
Car manufacturers of Taiwan
Formosa Plastics Group
Vehicle manufacturing companies established in 1996